Dawg Duos is a collaborative bluegrass album by David Grisman and 12 different artists, released in 1999. Each of them performs a duo with Grisman on mandolin or mandola. The instruments are as diverse as drums, accordion, autoharp, besides banjo, guitar, string bass, and violin. 
[]. This album can be compared with similar effort by Béla Fleck, Double Time, where Grisman performs duo with Fleck on one of the tracks.

Track listing
 Mando-Bass boogie Sonata (Grisman) 3:01
 Clinch Mountain Windmills (Legrand, Stanley) 5:46
 Mandoharp Fantasy (Grisman) 3:38
 Buttons and Bows (Evans, Livingston) 5:27
 Caprice for CM (Grisman) 4:58
 Trinidadian Rag (Brozman, Grisman) 4:52
 Anouman (Reinhardt) 7:08
 John Johanna 2:55
 Swingin' Sorento 4:23
 New Delhi Duo (Grisman, Hussain) 9:38
 Mule Skinner Blues (Christian, Rodgers, Vaughn) 1:44
 Old Souls (Barrio, Grisman, Lage, Reeves) 8:14

Personnel
David Grisman - mandolin, mandola (1-12)
 Edgar Meyer - bass (1)
 Béla Fleck - banjo (2)
 Bryan Bowers - autoharp (3)
 Hal Blaine - drums (4)
 Mark O'Connor - violin (5)
 Bob Brozman - national guitar (6)
 Denny Zeitlin - piano (7)
 Mike Seeger - banjo (8)
 Jim Boggio - accordion (9)
 Zakir Hussain - percussion (10)
 Vassar Clements - violin (11)
 Julian Lage - guitar (12)

References

Acoustic Disc albums
David Grisman albums
John Hartford albums
1999 albums
Instrumental duet albums